is a railway station in Aoba-ku, Sendai, Miyagi Prefecture, Japan, operated by East Japan Railway Company (JR East).

Lines

Station layout
Sakunami Station has one side platform and one island platform, connected to the station building by a level crossing. The station is staffed.

Platforms

History
Sakunami Station opened on 30 August 1931. The station was absorbed into the JR East network upon the privatization of JNR on 1 April 1987. A new station building was completed in March 2008.

Passenger statistics
In fiscal 2018, the station was used by an average of 186 passengers daily (boarding passengers only).

Surrounding area
Sakunami Onsen

References

External links

 

Stations of East Japan Railway Company
Railway stations in Sendai
Senzan Line
Railway stations in Japan opened in 1931